Allenhurst, also known as Oakland, is an historic site located in Scott County, Kentucky west of Georgetown on Cane Run Pike.  The Greek Revival house, designed by Thomas Lewinski, was built in 1850. The property was added to the U.S. National Register of Historic Places on April 2, 1973.

History
In 1837, William G. and Polly Craig acquired property west of Georgetown in Scott County, Kentucky from William Suggett, Polly's father. Craig was a Baptist minister and faculty member at Georgetown College.  He constructed a Greek Revival mansion on the land in 1850 and called it Oakland.

According to local legend, as recounted by Ann Bolton in A History of Scott County as Told by Selected Buildings (1989), Craig called on his cousin to act as contractor for construction of the mansion. Newton Craig, superintendent of the Kentucky State Penitentiary, had the house built by convict labor. The superintendent earned $21,826 and the state $37,899 in the transaction.

H.C. Allen, known for developing the first American Aberdeen Angus cattle herd, purchased the property and renamed it Allenhurst.

Architecture
Allenhurst was designed by Thomas Lewinski, known as one of the leading architects of the Greek Revival style. The exterior of the structure exhibits one of the most complete uses of the temple-style facade in Central Kentucky.  The pillared house has a two-story high portico with four columns, and fluted Doric columns paired on each side of central entrance. The temple-style design features "triple windows set under stone lintels that are repeated even on the basement level."

A pillared smokehouse with a hipped roof is located north of the great house.

References

Houses completed in 1850
National Register of Historic Places in Scott County, Kentucky
Houses in Scott County, Kentucky
Houses on the National Register of Historic Places in Kentucky
1850 establishments in Kentucky
Greek Revival houses in Kentucky